Grotta Gigante ("Giant Cave",  or Jama pri Briščikih), also known as Riesengrotte or as Grotta di Brisciachi, is a giant cave on the Italian side of the Trieste Karst (Carso), close to the village of Borgo Grotta Gigante or Briščiki in the municipality of Sgonico.

Overview
The cave contains many large stalactites and stalagmites, many of exceptional beauty.

History 
The cave was first explored by Antonio Federico Lindner in 1840. At the time, the karst behind Trieste was being searched for underground water from the Timavo River so as to be able to plan the city's aqueduct. In 1897, it was fully mapped by Andrea Perko, properly equipped for guided tours in 1905 by Club Touristi Triestini, and inaugurated in 1908. After World War I, ownership went to the Julian Alpine Society. Tourism only really began in 1957, when electricity was installed, unveiling new perspectives and details.

Museum
The Museum of Speleology is near the cave, and besides the various speleological, geological, and paleontological finds, it also includes some valuable archeological pieces and a poster collection of the cave. Two wide parking lots are available on the outside. Visits are scheduled at regular intervals throughout the day with expert guides.  A guided walk through the cave takes about an hour.

References

External links 

 Official Grotta Gigante website 

Gigante
Show caves in Italy
Limestone caves
Landforms of Friuli-Venezia Giulia
Province of Trieste
Tourist attractions in Friuli-Venezia Giulia
Museums in Friuli-Venezia Giulia
Natural history museums in Italy